Bobby Gene Bartow (August 18, 1930 January 3, 2012) was an American men's college basketball coach. The Browning, Missouri, native coached 36 years at six universities after coaching two high schools in Missouri for six years. In 1972 Bartow coached the Puerto Rico national basketball team in the 1972 Munich Olympic Games.

High school
Bartow began his coaching at the prep level in Missouri, coaching Shelbina and St. Charles High School basketball squads to a 145–39 win–loss mark in six seasons. His 1957 St. Charles team won the state championship, defeating North Kansas City in the Class L finals by a score of 60–54.

College
Bartow coached at Central Missouri State University from 1961 to 1964, Valparaiso University from 1964 to 1970, and Memphis State University from 1970 until 1974, and he led the Memphis State Tigers to the 1973 NCAA national championship game and consecutive Missouri Valley Conference titles in the 1971–72 and 1972–73 seasons. He coached the US national team in the 1974 FIBA World Championship, winning the bronze medal.

Bartow signed a five-year contract to replace Harv Schmidt at the University of Illinois in 1974 but stayed only one year. The Fighting Illini finished tied for last in the Big Ten at 4–14 (8–18 overall) in 1975, Bartow's only season there before he broke his contract and left for UCLA. He was succeeded by Lou Henson.

UCLA
Bartow left the Midwest for Los Angeles to succeed coaching legend John Wooden as the head coach at UCLA. He led the Bruins from 1975 to 1977, guiding them to Pac-8 titles and a  record, including a berth in the Final Four in 1976, falling to Indiana, the undefeated eventual champion. In 1977, his second-ranked UCLA lost to unranked Idaho State by a point in the Sweet Sixteen at  As of 2020, he his two seasons had the second-highest winning percentage at UCLA, behind Cunningham (.862).

UAB
After just two years at UCLA, Bartow left in 1977 to take over the job of creating an athletic program at the University of Alabama at Birmingham (UAB). He served as the Blazers' first head basketball coach and athletic director for 18 years. Bartow led UAB to the NIT in 1980, the program's second year of existence, and followed that up with seven straight NCAA tournament appearances, including advancements to the Sweet Sixteen in 1981 and the Elite Eight in 1982.

Bartow retired from coaching in 1996, and in 1997, UAB renamed its basketball venue Bartow Arena in his honor. His son Murry, a UAB assistant, became the coach upon Bartow's retirement; Bartow was later president of Hoops, LP, the company that runs the Memphis Grizzlies and the FedEx Forum.

Honors
In 1989, Bartow was inducted into the Alabama Sports Hall of Fame, 10 years later, in 1999, Central Missouri State (now the University of Central Missouri) also elected him to theirs.
Bartow was also voted one of Valparaiso University's 150 most influential people in October 2009. Bartow was inducted into the National Collegiate Basketball Hall of Fame in Kansas City on November 22, 2009, along with fellow inductees Magic Johnson, Larry Bird, Wayman Tisdale, Jud Heathcote, Walter Byers, Travis Grant and Bill Wall. In 2013, Bartow was selected for induction into the Mid-America Intercollegiate Athletics Association (MIAA) Hall of Fame.

Death
On April 15, 2009, a UAB spokesman revealed that Bartow had been diagnosed with stomach cancer; he died at his home in Birmingham in early 2012 after a two-year battle with the disease.

Head coaching record

College

See also
 List of college men's basketball coaches with 600 wins
 List of NCAA Division I Men's Final Four appearances by coach

References

External links
 Sports Reference Gene Bartow
 

1930 births
2012 deaths
American men's basketball coaches
American men's basketball players
Basketball coaches from Missouri
Basketball players from Missouri
BSN coaches
Deaths from cancer in Alabama
Central Missouri Mules basketball coaches
College men's basketball head coaches in the United States
Deaths from stomach cancer
Illinois Fighting Illini men's basketball coaches
Memphis Tigers men's basketball coaches
People from Browning, Missouri
Sportspeople from Birmingham, Alabama
Truman Bulldogs men's basketball players
UAB Blazers athletic directors
UAB Blazers men's basketball coaches
UCLA Bruins men's basketball coaches
United States men's national basketball team coaches
Valparaiso Beacons men's basketball coaches